Dragon, also known as Dragon 1 or Cargo Dragon, was a class of fourteen partially reusable cargo spacecraft developed by SpaceX, an American private space transportation company. The spacecraft flew 23 missions between 2010 and 2020. Dragon was launched into orbit by the company's Falcon 9 launch vehicle to resupply the International Space Station (ISS).

During its maiden flight in December 2010, Dragon became the first commercially built and operated spacecraft to be recovered successfully from orbit. On 25 May 2012, a cargo variant of Dragon became the first commercial spacecraft to successfully rendezvous with and attach to the ISS. SpaceX contracted to deliver cargo to the ISS under NASA's Commercial Resupply Services program, and Dragon began regular cargo flights in October 2012. With the Dragon spacecraft and the Orbital ATK Cygnus, NASA sought to increase its partnerships with domestic commercial aviation and aeronautics industry.

On 3 June 2017, the C106 capsule, largely assembled from previously flown components from the CRS-4 mission in September 2014, was launched again for the first time on CRS-11, after being refurbished.

The last flight of the first version of the Dragon spacecraft (Dragon 1) launched 7 March 2020 (UTC) on cargo resupply mission (CRS-20) to International Space Station (ISS). This mission was the last mission of SpaceX of the first Commercial Resupply Services (CRS-1) program, and marked the retirement of the Dragon 1 fleet. Further SpaceX commercial resupply flights to ISS under the second Commercial Resupply Services (CRS-2) program use the cargo-carrying variant of the SpaceX Dragon 2 spacecraft.

History 
SpaceX began developing the Dragon space capsule in late 2004, making a public announcement in 2006 with a plan of entering service in 2009. Also in 2006, SpaceX won a contract to use the Dragon space capsule for commercial resupply services to the International Space Station for the American federal space agency, NASA.

NASA ISS resupply contract

Commercial Orbital Transportation Services 

In 2005, NASA solicited proposals for a commercial ISS resupply cargo vehicle to replace the then-soon-to-be-retired Space Shuttle, through its Commercial Orbital Transportation Services (COTS) development program. The Dragon space capsule was a part of SpaceX's proposal, submitted to NASA in March 2006. SpaceX's COTS proposal was issued as part of a team, which also included MD Robotics, the Canadian company that had built the ISS's Canadarm2.

On 18 August 2006, NASA announced that SpaceX had been chosen, along with Kistler Aerospace, to develop cargo launch services for the ISS. The initial plan called for three demonstration flights of SpaceX's Dragon spacecraft to be conducted between 2008 and 2010. SpaceX and Kistler were to receive up to US$278 million and US$207 million respectively, if they met all NASA milestones, but Kistler failed to meet its obligations, and its contract was terminated in 2007. NASA later re-awarded Kistler's contract to Orbital Sciences Corporation.

Commercial Resupply Services Phase 1 
On 23 December 2008, NASA awarded a US$1.6 billion Commercial Resupply Services (CRS-1) contract to SpaceX, with contract options that could potentially increase the maximum contract value to US$3.1 billion.

On 23 February 2009, SpaceX announced that its chosen phenolic-impregnated carbon ablator heat shield material, PICA-X, had passed heat stress tests in preparation for Dragon's maiden launch. The primary proximity-operations sensor for the Dragon spacecraft, the DragonEye, was tested in early 2009 during the STS-127 mission, when it was mounted near the docking port of the Space Shuttle Endeavour and used while the Shuttle approached the International Space Station. The DragonEye's lidar and thermography (thermal imaging) abilities were both tested successfully. The COTS UHF Communication Unit (CUCU) and Crew Command Panel (CCP) were delivered to the ISS during the late 2009 STS-129 mission. The CUCU allows the ISS to communicate with Dragon and the CCP allows ISS crew members to issue basic commands to Dragon. In summer 2009, SpaceX hired former NASA astronaut Ken Bowersox as vice president of their new Astronaut Safety and Mission Assurance Department, in preparation for crews using the spacecraft.

As a condition of the NASA CRS contract, SpaceX analyzed the orbital radiation environment on all Dragon systems, and how the spacecraft would respond to spurious radiation events. That analysis and the Dragon design – which uses an overall Fault tolerance triple redundant computer architecture, rather than individual radiation hardening of each computer processor – was reviewed by independent experts before being approved by NASA for the cargo flights.

During March 2015, it was announced that SpaceX had been awarded an additional three missions under Commercial Resupply Services Phase 1. These additional missions are SpaceX CRS-13, SpaceX CRS-14 and SpaceX CRS-15 and would cover the cargo needs of 2017. On 24 February 2016, SpaceNews disclosed that SpaceX had been awarded a further five missions under Commercial Resupply Services Phase 1. This additional tranche of missions had SpaceX CRS-16 and SpaceX CRS-17 manifested for FY2017 while SpaceX CRS-18, SpaceX CRS-19 and SpaceX CRS-20 and were notionally manifested for FY2018.

Commercial Resupply Services Phase 2 
The Commercial Resupply Services-2 (CRS-2) contract definition and solicitation period commenced in 2014. In January 2016, NASA awarded contracts to SpaceX, Orbital ATK, and Sierra Nevada Corporation for a minimum of six launches each, with missions planned until at least 2024. The maximum potential value of all the contracts was announced as US$14 billion, but the minimum requirements would be considerably less. No further financial information was disclosed.

CRS-2 launches began in late 2019.

Demonstration flights 

The first flight of the Falcon 9, a private flight, occurred in June 2010 and launched a stripped-down version of the Dragon capsule. This Dragon Spacecraft Qualification Unit had initially been used as a ground test bed to validate several of the capsule's systems. During the flight, the unit's primary mission was to relay aerodynamic data captured during the ascent. It was not designed to survive re-entry, and did not.

NASA contracted for three test flights from SpaceX, but later reduced that number to two. The first Dragon spacecraft launched on its first mission – contracted to NASA as COTS Demo Flight 1 – on 8 December 2010, and was successfully recovered following re-entry to Earth's atmosphere. The mission also marked the second flight of the Falcon 9 launch vehicle. The DragonEye sensor flew again on STS-133 in February 2011 for further on-orbit testing. In November 2010, the Federal Aviation Administration (FAA) had issued a re-entry license for the Dragon capsule, the first such license ever awarded to a commercial vehicle.

The second Dragon flight, also contracted to NASA as a demonstration mission, launched successfully on 22 May 2012, after NASA had approved SpaceX's proposal to combine the COTS 2 and 3 mission objectives into a single Falcon 9/Dragon flight, renamed COTS 2+. Dragon conducted orbital tests of its navigation systems and abort procedures, before being grappled by the ISS' Canadarm2 and successfully berthing with the station on 25 May 2012 to offload its cargo. Dragon returned to Earth on 31 May 2012, landing as scheduled in the Pacific Ocean, and was again successfully recovered.

On 23 August 2012, NASA Administrator Charles Bolden announced that SpaceX had completed all required milestones under the COTS contract, and was cleared to begin operational resupply missions to the ISS.

Returning research materials from orbit 
Other than the Russian Soyuz crew capsule, Dragon is the only currently operating spacecraft designed to survive re-entry. Because Dragon allows for the return of critical materials to researchers in as little as 48 hours from splashdown, it opens the possibility of new experiments on ISS that can produce materials for later analysis on ground using more sophisticated instrumentation. For example, CRS-12 returned mice that have spent time in orbit which will help give insight into how microgravity impacts blood vessels in both the brain and eyes, and in determining how arthritis develops.

Operational flights 

Dragon was launched on its first operational CRS flight on 8 October 2012, and completed the mission successfully on 28 October 2012. NASA initially contracted SpaceX for 12 operational missions, and later extended the CRS contract with 8 more flights, bringing the total to 20 launches until 2019. In 2016, a new batch of 6 missions under the CRS-2 contract was assigned to SpaceX; those missions are scheduled to be launched between 2020 and 2024.

Reuse of previously-flown capsules 
CRS-11, SpaceX's eleventh CRS mission, was successfully launched on 3 June 2017 from Kennedy Space Center LC-39A, being the 100th mission to be launched from that pad. This mission was the first to re-fly a previously flown Dragon capsule. This mission delivered 2,708 kilograms of cargo to the International Space Station, including Neutron Star Interior Composition Explorer (NICER). The first stage of the Falcon 9 launch vehicle landed successfully at Landing Zone 1. This mission launched for the first time a refurbished Dragon capsule, serial number C106, which had flown in September 2014 on the CRS-4 mission, and was the first time since 2011 a reused spacecraft arrived at the ISS. Gemini SC-2 capsule is the only other reused capsule, but it was only reflown suborbitally in 1966.

CRS-12, SpaceX's twelfth CRS mission, was successfully launched on the first "Block 4" version of the Falcon 9 on 14 August 2017 from Kennedy Space Center LC-39A at the first attempt. This mission delivered  of pressurized mass and  unpressurized. The external payload manifested for this flight was the CREAM cosmic-ray detector. Last flight of a newly built Dragon capsule; further missions will use refurbished spacecraft.

CRS-13, SpaceX's thirteenth CRS mission, was the second use of a previously flown Dragon capsule, but the first time in concordance with a reused first-stage booster. It was successfully launched on 15 December 2017 from Cape Canaveral Air Force Station Space Launch Complex 40 at the first attempt. This was the first launch from SLC-40 since the AMOS-6 pad anomaly. The booster was the previously flown core from the CRS-11 mission. This mission delivered  of pressurized mass and  unpressurized. It returned from orbit and splashdown on 13 January 2018, making it the first space capsule to be reflown to orbit more than once.

CRS-14, SpaceX's fourteenth CRS mission, was the third reuse of a previously flown Dragon capsule. It was successfully launched on 2 April 2018 from Cape Canaveral Air Force Station SLC-40. It was successfully berthed to the ISS on 4 April 2018 and remained berthed for a month before returning cargo and science experiments back to Earth.

CRS-15, CRS-16, CRS-17, CRS-18, CRS-19, and CRS-20 were all flown with previously flown capsules.

Crewed development program 

In 2006, Elon Musk stated that SpaceX had built "a prototype flight crew capsule, including a thoroughly tested 30-man-day life-support system". A video simulation of the launch escape system's operation was released in January 2011. Musk stated in 2010 that the developmental cost of a crewed Dragon and Falcon 9 would be between US$800 million and US$1 billion. In 2009 and 2010, Musk suggested on several occasions that plans for a crewed variant of the Dragon were proceeding and had a two-to-three-year timeline to completion. SpaceX submitted a bid for the third phase of CCDev, CCiCap.

Development funding 
In 2014, SpaceX released the total combined development costs for both the Falcon 9 launch vehicle and the Dragon capsule. NASA provided US$396 million while SpaceX provided over US$450 million to fund both development efforts.<ref name="AtlanticCouncil20140604">{{cite AV media|url=https://www.youtube.com/watch?v=sYocHwhfFDc| archive-url=https://web.archive.org/web/20140605154442/http://www.youtube.com/watch?v=sYocHwhfFDc&gl=US&hl=en| archive-date=2014-06-05 | url-status=dead|title=Discussion with Gwynne Shotwell, President and COO, SpaceX |publisher=Atlantic Council|first=Gwynne|last=Shotwell|time=12:20–13:10|date=4 June 2014|access-date=8 June 2014|quote=NASA ultimately gave us about $396 million; SpaceX put in over $450 million ... [for an] EELV-class launch vehicle ... as well as a capsule}}</ref>

 Production 

In December 2010, the SpaceX production line was reported to be manufacturing one new Dragon spacecraft and Falcon 9 rocket every three months. Elon Musk stated in a 2010 interview that he planned to increase production turnover to one Dragon every six weeks by 2012. Composite materials are extensively used in the spacecraft's manufacture to reduce weight and improve structural strength.

SpaceX published a photograph showing the six, including the next four NASA Commercial Resupply Services (CRS-1) mission Dragons (CRS-3, CRS-4, CRS-5, CRS-6) plus the drop-test Dragon, and the pad-abort Dragon weldment for commercial crew program.

 Design 

The Dragon spacecraft consists of a nose-cone cap, a conventional blunt-cone ballistic capsule, and an unpressurized cargo-carrier trunk equipped with two solar arrays. The capsule uses a PICA-X heat shield, based on a proprietary variant of NASA's Phenolic impregnated carbon ablator (PICA) material, designed to protect the capsule during Earth atmospheric entry, even at high return velocities from Lunar and Martian missions. The Dragon capsule is re-usable, and can fly multiple missions. The trunk is not recoverable; it separates from the capsule before re-entry and burns up in Earth's atmosphere. The trunk section, which carries the spacecraft's solar panels and allows the transport of unpressurized cargo to the ISS, was first used for cargo on the SpaceX CRS-2 mission.

The spacecraft is launched atop a Falcon 9 booster. The Dragon capsule is equipped with 18 Draco thrusters. During its initial cargo and crew flights, the Dragon capsule will land in the Pacific Ocean and be returned to the shore by ship.

For the ISS Dragon cargo flights, the ISS's Canadarm2 grapples its Flight-Releasable Grapple Fixture and berths Dragon to the station's US Orbital Segment using a Common Berthing Mechanism (CBM). The CRS Dragon does not have an independent means of maintaining a breathable atmosphere for astronauts and instead circulates in fresh air from the ISS. For typical missions, Dragon is planned to remain berthed to the ISS for about 30 days.

The Dragon capsule can transport  of cargo, which can be all pressurized, all unpressurized, or a combination thereof. The trunk was first used operationally on the Dragon's CRS-2 mission in March 2013. Its solar arrays produce a peak power of 4 kW.

The design was modified beginning with the fifth Dragon flight on the SpaceX CRS-3 mission to the ISS in March 2014. While the outer mold line of the Dragon was unchanged, the avionics and cargo racks were redesigned to supply substantially more electrical power to powered cargo devices, including the GLACIER freezer module and MERLIN freezer module freezer modules for transporting critical science payloads.

 Variants and derivatives 
 DragonLab 
SpaceX planned to fly the Dragon spacecraft in a free-flying configuration, known as DragonLab. Its subsystems include propulsion, power, thermal and environmental control (ECLSS), avionics, communications, thermal protection, flight software, guidance and navigation systems, and entry, descent, landing, and recovery gear. It has a total combined upmass of  upon launch, and a maximum downmass of  when returning to Earth. In November 2014, there were two DragonLab missions listed on the SpaceX launch manifest: one in 2016 and another in 2018. However, these missions were removed from the manifest in early 2017, with no official SpaceX statement. The American Biosatellites once performed similar uncrewed payload-delivery functions, and the Russian Bion satellites still continue to do so.

 List of vehicles 

 List of missions Launch dates are listed in UTC. Specifications 

 DragonLab 
The following specifications are published by SpaceX for the non-NASA, non-ISS commercial flights of the refurbished Dragon capsules, listed as "DragonLab" flights on the SpaceX manifest. The specifications for the NASA-contracted Dragon Cargo were not included in the 2009 DragonLab datasheet.

 Pressure vessel 
  interior pressurized, environmentally controlled, payload volume.
 Onboard environment: ; relative humidity 25~75%; 13.9~14.9 psia air pressure (958.4~1027 hPa).

 Unpressurized sensor bay (recoverable payload) 
  unpressurized payload volume.
 Sensor bay hatch opens after orbit insertion to allow full sensor access to the outer space environment, and closes before Earth atmosphere re-entry.

 Unpressurized trunk (non-recoverable) 

 Power, communication and command systems 
 Power: twin solar panels providing 1500 watts average, 4000 watts peak, at 28 and 120 VDC.
 Spacecraft communication: commercial standard RS-422 and military standard 1553 serial I/O, plus Ethernet communications for IP-addressable standard payload service.
 Command uplink: 300 kbit/s.
 Telemetry/data downlink: 300 Mbit/s standard, fault-tolerant S-band telemetry and video transmitters.

 Radiation tolerance 
Dragon uses a "radiation-tolerant" design in the electronic hardware and software that make up its flight computers. The system uses three pairs of computers, each constantly checking on the others, to instantiate a fault-tolerant design. In the event of a radiation upset or soft error, one of the computer pairs will perform a soft reboot.
Including the flight computers, Dragon employs 18 triply-redundant processing units, for a total of 54 processors.

 See also 

 Comparison of space station cargo vehicles
 List of human spaceflight programs
 Space Shuttle successors
Cargo Dragon C208 and C209

 Comparable vehicles 

 Cargo 

 
 
 
 
 
 
 

 Crew 
 
 
 

 References 

 External links 
  at SpaceX
 SpaceX CCDev2 Agreement with NASA
 SpaceX CCDev2 bi-monthly progress reports
 Dragon cargo delivery to ISS (COTS 2 highlight reel)
 Dragon crew transport to ISS (CG rendering)
 "SpaceX Reveals Its New Dragon Space Capsule". Slate''. 30 May 2014.

 
Dragon
Cargo spacecraft
Dragon
Vehicles introduced in 2010
Commercial spaceflight
Reusable spacecraft
SpaceX related lists